Abolition of the Royal Familia is the sixteenth studio album by English ambient house duo the Orb. The album was released on 27 March 2020 via Cooking Vinyl. It includes contributions from Youth, Roger Eno, Gaudi, David Harrow, and Steve Hillage and Miquette Giraudy (System 7).

Track listing

Charts

See also
List of 2020 albums

References

2020 albums
The Orb albums
Cooking Vinyl albums